Paper Cannot Wrap Up Embers is a 2007 French-Cambodian documentary film directed by Rithy Panh.

In this film, the director examines prostitution in Cambodia.

Release
The film premiered in January 2007 at the International Festival of Audiovisual Programs in Biarritz, where it was in competition in the creative documentaries section. The film was then screened in March at the Cinéma du réel - International Documentary Film Festival in Paris. It was then was broadcast on French television on March 30, 2007 and received a theatrical release in France on March 31, 2007.

Paper Cannot Wrap Up Embers won the Magnolia Award for Social Documentary (silver) at the Shanghai Television Festival.

References

External links

2007 films
French documentary films
Documentary films about prostitution
Khmer-language films
Films directed by Rithy Panh
2007 documentary films
Cambodian documentary films
European Film Awards winners (films)
Films about prostitution in Cambodia
2000s French films